Edmond Richard was a French writer, as well as being the first biographer and last lover of Apollonie Sabatier.

External links

 Thierry Savatier , Une femme trop gaie, Biographie d'un amour de Baudelaire

French biographers
French male non-fiction writers